Afsana Pyar Ka 
(translation: The Tale of Love) is a 1991 Indian romantic drama film starring Aamir Khan and Neelam.  The music of the film became successful, especially the song "Tip Tip Tip Tip Baarish Shuru Ho Gayi".

Plot
Animosity has existed between the families of Raj and Nikita's respective fathers. But their children have grown up without any knowledge of this animosity. They meet in college, and after a few misunderstandings both fall in love with each other. They plan to marry, and accordingly inform their respective families of their plans. Both the families view this alliance with anger, and refuse to bless the young couple. Raj and Nikita have one choice - marry the person their respective families have selected for them, or elope.

Cast
 Aamir Khan as Raj
 Neelam as Nikita
 Deepak Tijori as Deepak
 Kiran Kumar as Mahendra Behl 
 Beena Banerjee as Beena 
 Saeed Jaffrey as Anand Verma 
 Rakesh Bedi as Rakesh
 Amita Nangia as Deepa
 Viju Khote as Gurumurthy 
 Jeet Upendra as Vikram

Music

References

External links

1990s Hindi-language films
Films scored by Bappi Lahiri
1991 films
Hindi-language romance films